The 1984–85 Scottish First Division season was won by Motherwell, who were promoted along with Clydebank to  the Premier Division. Meadowbank Thistle and St Johnstone were relegated to the Second Division.

Table

References

1984-1985
2
Scot